The year 2013 in Japanese music.

Events
64th NHK Kōhaku Uta Gassen

Best-sellers
Best-selling singles

Number-ones
Number-one albums
Oricon number-one singles
Hot 100 number-one singles

Awards
2013 MTV Video Music Awards Japan

Deaths
Eiichi Ohtaki dies on December 30.

Groups disestablished
Move

Albums released

January

February

March

April

May

June

July

August

September

October

December

Debuting artists

See also
 2013 in Japan
 2013 in Japanese television
 List of Japanese films of 2013

References